Krampus: The Devil Returns (also known as Krampus 2: The Devil Returns) is a 2016 American horror film that was written and directed by Jason Hull. The film is a sequel to the 2013 film from Hull titled Krampus: The Christmas Devil and stars A.J. Leslie, Melantha Blackthorn, R.A. Mihailoff and Paul Ferm. The film was produced under the Snow Dog Studio banner and distributed worldwide by ITN Distribution with a release date of October 4, 2016.

Synopsis 
Unable to solve the onslaught of missing children in their town, Police Officers Dave Kane (Darin Foltz) and Paul Sharp (Darren Barcomb) lure former officer Jeremy Duffin (A.J. Leslie) out of his self imposed exile following the murder of his wife and the abduction of his daughter at the hands of Krampus (Ben Berlin). After much debate and with the hopes of finding his daughter, Duffin reluctantly agrees to track the monster and is accompanied by his hulking woodsman friend Monk (Johnny Stevenson). Once back to civilization, Duffin, Monk, Kane, and Sharp are joined by cops Gil Farabee (Rich Goteri), Harry Sharp (Michael Mili)  and Lori Taylor (Tiffany Fest). The quest to find Krampus and the children is further complicated by run-ins with tough guy Stuart (R.A. Mihailoff) and his gang consisting of Natasha (Melantha Blackthorn), T.J. (Bill Kennedy), Trevor (Bill James) and Rick (Arturo Rivera)....along with a nasty Santa Claus (Paul Ferm).

Cast 
 A.J. Leslie as Jeremy Duffin
 Melantha Blackthorne as Natashia
 R.A. Mihailoff as Stuart   
 Tiffani Fest as Lori Taylor
 Richard Goteri as Gil Farabee
 Michael Mili as Harry Sharp
 Paul Ferm as Santa Clause
 Darin Foltz as Dave Kane
 Johnny Stevenson as Monk
 Darren Barcomb as Paul Sharp
 Bill Kennedy as T.J.
 Daniel James as Trevor
 Robbie Barnes as Amy Baker
 Arturo Rivera as Rick
 Shawn C. Phillips as Rob Sanderson
 Jason Hull as Neighbor Bill
 Will Barrett as Post Office Worker
 Ben Berlin as Krampus

Production 

The film was completed in Erie, Pennsylvania and Edinboro, Pennsylvania in the winter months of 2016.

Reception 
Krampus 2: The Devil Returns received mixed reviews from notable horror web-sites and platforms. Culturecrypt.com gave the film zero stars, stating that "Anyone on your naughty list should be forced to watch this execrable excuse for a movie."  Morehorror.com reviewed the film favorably though, with Jesse Miller writing that "I rather enjoyed my time with Krampus 2 and I believe it’s because it knows exactly what it is – a low budget hybrid beast of ideas that all seem to gel together to create a feature that goes down smashingly." Ben Spurling of Horrornews.net chimed in with "The script, as in most micro-budget horror movies, is a bit muddled and isn’t clarified any by sluggish direction and listless editing. There are a few twists thrown in, one rather surprising and distasteful, and a couple of almost adequate scenes of the police skulking through falling snow in search of their prey; but still, the final completed product is strictly small change and only for the Killer Christmas completest." The-other-view.com also gave the film a mixed review but said this of the twist ending: "With any bad film, especially one with a “twist”, I’d have spoiled it without as much as a care. However, I’ll jump the gun and say that with “Krampus: The Devil Returns”, it needs to be seen to be believed, especially if you’re aware of the events from the first film. I honestly did not see that one coming!"

Awards 
Krampus 2: The Devil Returns took home awards for Best Feature Film, Best Director (Jason Hull) and Best Supporting Actress in a Feature Film (Melantha Blackthorne) at the 2016 FANtastic  Horror Film Festival in San Diego, California.

The film also placed third in the category of Feature Horror Films at the  2017 Indie Gathering International Film Festival.

References

External links 
 

2016 films
2016 horror films
2010s comedy horror films
2010s Christmas horror films
2010s comedy thriller films
American films with live action and animation
American comedy horror films
American satirical films
American Christmas horror films
Demons in film
Films based on European myths and legends
Films shot in Erie, Pennsylvania
Films shot in Pennsylvania
Krampus in film
2016 comedy films
2010s English-language films
2010s American films